Federal Highway 68 (Carretera Federal 68) (Fed. 68) is a toll-free part of the federal highway corridors (los corredores carreteros federales) of Mexico. The highway 
connects Playa Novillero, Nayarit in the west near the Pacific Ocean to Fed. 15.

References

068